This gallery of coats of arms of the autonomous communities of Spain shows the distinctive coats of arms of the 17 autonomous communities of Spain (constitutionally they are the nationalities and regions in which Spain is territorially organized), plus the autonomous cities of Ceuta and Melilla.

Autonomies

Autonomous communities

Autonomous cities

See also
 Autonomous communities of Spain
 Anthems of the autonomous communities of Spain
 Flags of the autonomous communities of Spain

 
Armorials of Spain
 Coats of arms
Spain geography-related lists